Oytograk is a township in Yutian County (Keriya), Hotan Prefecture, Xinjiang, China.


Name
Oytograk means 'desert poplar forest lowland' in Uyghur, so named because it is located in a lowland surrounded by sand dunes that has many desert poplars.

History
In 1958, Zhandou Commune was established.

In 1984, Zhandou Commune became Oytograk Township.

Geography
Oytograk is on the northern side of China National Highway 315.

Administrative divisions
Yeyik includes one residential community, sixteen villages, and one other area:

Residential community (Mandarin Chinese Hanyu Pinyin-derived names except where Uyghur is provided):
Xinjiayuan

Villages:
Tawugazi, Taleke'airike, Langanwusitang (meaning 'relay station canal' in Uyghur), Ya'ermaili, Toghraq'östeng (Tuogelawusitang;  / ), Kule'airike, Yesiyoulegun (Yesiyou Leguncun) , Tumuya, A'erkawusitang, Yigeziduwei, Kalakumushi, Afutapulekekule, Bayilake, Alega, Yinake, Baiheti

Other areas:
Tianjin Industrial Park Administrative Area

Economy
Oytograk produces muskmelon, and is known for Daqingtao. There is silkworm farming in Oytograk. Groundwater resources are plentiful.

The total area of cultivated land in Oytograk increased between 1977 and 2002.

Demographics

, the population of Oytograk, in total about 15,000 residents, was Uyghur.

Transportation
 China National Highway 315

Historical maps

Notes

References

Populated places in Xinjiang
Township-level divisions of Xinjiang